Stade Louis Achille is a multi-use stadium in Fort-de-France, Martinique. It is currently used mostly for football matches and hosts the home games of Good Luck. The stadium holds 9,000 people.

References 

Football venues in Martinique